Luc Arbogast (born in La Rochelle, France on 2 November 1975) is a French musician and singer, songwriter. He was a contestant in season 2 of the French television talent competition The Voice: la plus belle voix. After the show, he was signed to Mercury Records, a Universal Music Division.

Beginnings

Arbogast's father was a military man originating from Strasbourg, and his mother a nurse of German origin. He grew up in Égaux de Landrais, dans in Aigrefeuille-d'Aunis region, south-east of La Rochelle. In 1985 when he was just 10, the family moved to Alsace, in the Munster Valley. Luc went to the communal school of Metzeral, and then Collège Frédéric Hartmann in Munster. He became proficient in the Alsacien dialect. He also started playing the guitar and at a young age took part in musical events, notably in the light and sound show Transhumance that told the history of Val Saint-Grégoire. He continued his secondary schooling at Lycée Frédéric Kirschleger in Munster, and studied shoemaking.

Following early traditional music, the self-taught Arbogast started singing medieval songs accompanied by traditional instruments, notably Irish bouzouki, lute and bells. His repertoire is inspired by music by Cantigas de Santa Maria, songs from German lyric poet Walther von der Vogelweide, German mystical works of Hildegard of Bingen and from French composer Guillaume de Machaut amongst others. Starting in 1996, he worked as a busker choosing locations near cathedrals and town squares and took part in various festival dedicated to traditional medieval music all over France. Beginning in 2003, he started releasing limited edition independent albums like Fjall d'yr Vinur (2003), Domus (2004), Hortus Dei (2007) and Aux Portes de Sananda (2009). He took up a professional musical career in 2011. In 2012, he released the album Canticum in Terra. Artists participating included Mélinda Bressan on the Western concert flute, Aliocha Regnard on violin and nyckelharpa, Jean Louis Renou on percussions, and Sarah Picaud on backing vocals.

In The Voice, la plus belle voix
In 2013, Luc Arbogast took part in season 2 of the French reality television competition The Voice, la plus belle voix with all four judges (Garou, Jenifer, Florent Pagny and Louis Bertignac) turning their chairs around. He picked Jenifer as his mentor. He won the battle round against fellow Team Jenifer competitor Thomas Vaccari and reached the live rounds.

Performances
Blind audition (Episode 1, 2 February 2013): "Canción sefaradí" (short version)
Battle round (Episode 7, 16 March 2013): "Mad World" from Tears for Fears as duo with fellow contestant Thomas Vaccari (Moved to live rounds)
Live round 1 (Episode 11, 13 April 2013): "Adagio in G minor" by Remo Giazotto (Eliminated by public vote)

Other performances for the show
Moulins du Grizzly Tour, 14 March 2013): "Ces Idées Là" – duo by Louis Bertignac and Luc Arbogast

After The Voice
Despite being eliminated early in the competition, Arbogast proved popular with the French public with his 2013 album Odysseus entered the SNEP French Albums Chart straight in at No. 1.

In popular culture
During the World Figure Skating Championships held in Nice in 2012, French figure skating champion Brian Joubert skated with Luc Arbogast's song "An Freij de An Neo Era". During the gala Les Étoiles de la glisse in Courchevel on 30 December 2012, Arbogast accompanied him live, singing his song "Canción Sefaradí".

Discography

Albums

Singles

Other releases
2013: "Nausicaa (la Moldau)" (FR #84)
2013: "Eden (l'adagio d'Albinoni)" (FR #144)
2013: "Mad World" (FR #176)

References

External links
 Official website

French male songwriters
French male musicians
1975 births
Living people
French people of German descent
21st-century French singers
21st-century French male singers